Dracula wallisii is a species of orchid belonging to the genus Dracula. It is a common species, with large flowers that are often highly variable in form.

The species was first discovered near Frontino, Antioquia, Colombia by the German plant collector Gustav Wallis in 1871. It was formally described in 1875 by the German orchidologist Heinrich Gustav Reichenbach who named it after Wallis.

References

External links 

wallisii
Endemic orchids of Colombia